Herbert Harper, also known as Harry Harper (1 February 1889 – 6 August 1983), was an English cricketer who played a single first-class match, for Worcestershire against Yorkshire in 1920. Batting at seven, he was bowled in each innings, for 7 and 3, as Worcestershire went down to an innings defeat.

Although that was Harper's only appearance in first-class cricket, he had appeared for Warwickshire's Second XI before the First World War,
and scored 115 to help his side to an 11-wicket win (it was a 12-a-side game) against Worcestershire's Second XI in 1909.
He also umpired in the Minor Counties Championship in the late 1940s.

At the time of his death, after a fall at his home in Birmingham, age 94 years, 186 days, Harper was the oldest surviving County Championship cricketer.

Notes

References
 
 

1889 births
1983 deaths
English cricketers
Worcestershire cricketers